José Francisco García de Soto (born 23 June 1947), known as Chiqui, is a Spanish sailor. He competed in the Tornado event at the 1988 Summer Olympics. He was runner-up at the Snipe European Championship in 1982, and national champion in the Tornado class in 1986 and 1988, and in the Star class in 2005.

References

External links
 

1947 births
Living people
Spanish male sailors (sport)
Olympic sailors of Spain
Sailors at the 1988 Summer Olympics – Tornado
Sportspeople from Santander, Spain
Snipe class sailors
Sailors (sport) from Cantabria